The Abbey of Saint Martial (Limousin: Abadiá de Sent Marçau de Limòtges) was a monastery in Limoges, France, founded in 848 and dissolved in 1791.

The buildings were razed at the beginning of the 19th century. The only remaining part is the 10th-century crypt, which was rediscovered in 1960, and which contains the tomb of Saint Martial, the first bishop of Limoges, and also that of Saint Valerie of Limoges, another, possibly legendary, early martyr.

Origins
The origins of the abbey lie in the graveyard outside the original Roman settlement of Augustoritum. This is the site of the Place de la République, at the commercial heart of modern Limoges. The cemetery was the reputed burial place of early Christian martyrs, including Saint Martial, the first bishop of Limoges. This evolved into a place of pilgrimage in Merovingian times. By the 6th century, according to Gregory of Tours, there was a funerary chapel above Saint Martial's tomb, in the care of a small community of clerics, who were recognised as a congregation of canons in the reign of the Carolingian ruler, Louis the Pious (814-840). This community became a Benedictine abbey in 848, under Charles the Bald. A mosaic above the tomb of Saint Martial dates from approximately this time, and is set in hard cement from an earlier period, indicating that the shrine was already well-established and of some antiquity by the time the abbey was founded.

History
The abbey grew in importance and elaboration, alongside the "City of the Castle". This was a major commercial centre, under the patronage of the abbot, and outside the boundaries and control of the Cathedral City, dominated by the bishop. The body of Saint Martial was, at some time in the late 9th century, taken from its sarcophagus and placed for a time in a golden shrine in the great new church which was built over the spot. Here it was a magnet for pilgrims on the Way of St. James, benefiting from the wider pilgrim traffic throughout Western Europe.

The abbey reached the peak of its importance in the century following its take-over by Cluny Abbey in 1065, when it was famed for its literature and music. However, the shrine was stolen by Henry II of England, who was also the Duke of Aquitaine. Turmoil in the land was interpreted as the saint's response to the disturbance of his bones. The body was reburied and an altar placed above it.

The disturbances of the 12th century were followed by a period of rebuilding and a century of renewed prosperity. However, they had been only a foretaste of the destruction and disruption of the Hundred Years' War. The Limousin was not spared in the dynastic and religious conflicts of the 16th and 17th centuries. The abbey went through a protracted decline and it never recovered the greatness of its heyday.

There was considerable rebuilding and repair in the early 18th century. However, in 1791, during the French Revolution, the abbey community was dissolved, and in the following year the sacking and demolition of the building began. By 1807 this was complete. The area was levelled and turned into a new public space, the Place de la République. Portions of the relics of the martyrs, allegedly saved by faithful Catholic citizens of Limoges, were rehoused in the nearby church of St. Michel des Lions. The twin Castle and Cathedral cities were at last unified into a single municipality under secular governance.

Excavations were carried out from 1960, on the initiative of the city council, in the hope of uncovering the remains of the abbey and the shrine of Saint Martial. By 1962, the crypt containing the tombs of Saints Martial and Valerie had been rediscovered. Excavations were then pushed further to the east, revealing more church buildings belonging to the abbey. From 1966, the crypt with the surrounding area was consolidated and opened to the public, the whole being covered with a large concrete slab. Today, it is entered down a flight of steps from the Place de la République above. Admission is free.

Excavations started again in July 2015 to carry out detailed studies of the remains before revamping of the Place de la Republique.

Music

The abbey was the center of several important developments in medieval music, including liturgical chant, early polyphony and troubadours' songs. The first chant manuscripts show revisions of the early 11th century, when Roger de Chabannes introduced his nephew Adémar as cantor and scriptor of notation. A significant body of plainchant and tonaries for its modal classification had been written at the scriptorium of this Abbey (among them Pa 909, 1120, 1121, 1132, 1240). Adémar de Chabannes composed not only sequences and prosulae, but also music for a festal octave for the Patron St Martial. He engaged in vain for the recognition of St Martial as an apostle, which was the only condition to celebrate the patron a whole week long. Among the earliest sequences composed there is the Swan Sequence from c.850 (Pa 1139). The St. Martial school of music and its library contributed and collected an almost complete repertoire of West Frankish tropes and sequences, as well as the so-called Aquitanian polyphony (Pa 1139, 3549, 3719), because cantors of the region had been most inventive in quite original compositions, dealing with all kinds of troped poetry, and two part settings between discant and florid organum.

It is a famous site for 12th century sacred and secular church music. Some of the earliest troubadour lyrics with their accompanying melodies were extant in manuscripts at St. Martial's, now preserved at the Bibliothèque Nationale.

Gallery

References

Studies

Sources
 
 

 

 
 
 
 

 This article is based mainly on the English-language version of the guide to the excavated site, available free to visitors.

Limoges, Abbey of Saint-Martial
9th-century establishments in France
1791 disestablishments in France
Limoges, Abbey of Saint-Martial
Ruins in Nouvelle-Aquitaine
Churches in Haute-Vienne
Buildings and structures in Limoges
Tourist attractions in Haute-Vienne
Religious buildings and structures completed in 848